Pipe Organ is a 5,731-foot-elevation (1,747-meter) sandstone pillar located in Colorado National Monument, in Mesa County of western Colorado, United States. It is also immediately northwest of another popular climbing destination, Independence Monument, and both can be seen from viewpoints along Rim Rock Drive. The first ascent of the summit was made January 31, 1961, by John Auld, Gary Ziegler, Jim Dyson, and John Kuglin. Pipe Organ has a subsidiary summit unofficially named Organ Pipe Spire on the east aspect, which the National Park Service refers to as Praying Hands. This 325-foot-high subsidiary peak was originally named Squall Spire in 1976 by Harvey T. Carter of the first ascent party.

Geology
This tower is the remnant of a differentially eroded fin composed primarily of cliff-forming Wingate Sandstone, which consists of wind-borne, cross-bedded quartzose sandstones deposited as ancient sand dunes approximately 200 million years ago in the Late Triassic. The thin caprock at the summit consists of fluvial sandstones of the resistant Kayenta Formation. The slope around the base of Pipe Organ is Chinle Formation. The floor of the canyon is Precambrian basement rock consisting of gneiss, schist, and granites. Precipitation runoff from this geographical feature drains to the Colorado River, approximately two miles to the northeast.

Climate
According to the Köppen climate classification system, Pipe Organ is located in a semi-arid climate zone. Summers are hot and dry, while winters are cold with some snow. Temperatures reach  on 5.3 days,  on 57 days, and remain at or below freezing on 13 days annually. The months April through October offer the most favorable weather to visit.

Gallery

Climbing
Established rock climbing routes on Pipe Organ and Organ Pipe Spire:

 Southeast –  – 3 pitches – First Ascent 1961
 Southwest Face  – class 5.10+ C2 – 3 pitches
 Organ Pipe Spire – class 5.8+ – 2 pitches
 Sirocco – class 5.9 – FA 1976
 Pipe Dream – class 5.11+ – 5 pitches – FA 2005
 Aces & Eights – class 5.12 C2 – 4 pitches
 Ender's Game – class 5.10 – 3 pitches
 The Weird Fun  – class 5.10 – 3 pitches

See also
 List of rock formations in the United States
 Kissing Couple
 Sentinel Spire

References

External links
 Weather forecast: National Weather Service
 Pipe Organ rock climbing: Mountainproject.com
 Pipe Organ photo: USGS

Colorado Plateau
Landforms of Mesa County, Colorado
Colorado National Monument
North American 1000 m summits
Sandstone formations of the United States
Rock formations of Colorado
Climbing areas of Colorado